Richard Comyn (died c. 1179) was a Scottish noble who was the son of Sir William de Comyn, Constable of Scotland and Maude Basset, and also the nephew of William Cumin.

Richard was probably born between 1115 and 1123. In 1144, William Comyn gave him Northallerton Castle, which he had re-built a few years earlier. Shortly after, he received the castle and honour of Richmond as part of his uncle's settlement to renounce to Durham bishopric. In 1145, Richard was married to Hextilda, the daughter of Uchtred, Lord of Tynedale, and his wife Bethoc ingen Domnaill Bain, the supposed daughter of King Donald III of Scotland, although the chronology is suspect.

In Scotland, he acquired the position of Justiciar of Lothian: he witnessed 6 charters for King Malcolm IV and 33 for King William I. He was captured with King William in 1174 and was a hostage for him in the Treaty of Falaise. He gave, with Hextida's consent, lands to the monks at Hexham, Kelso and Holyrood. He died between 1179 and 1182. Hextilda remarried to Máel Coluim, Earl of Atholl (also called Malcolm).

Children
Richard had four sons by Hextilda:

John, died between 1152 and 1159, and buried at Kelso Abbey.
William, jure uxoris Earl of Buchan.
Odinel (also called Odo), a priest, witness to Richard's charters to religious houses in 1162 and 1166.
Simon, mentioned in the 1166 charter to the Augustinians in Holyrood.

and three daughters:

Idonea
Ada
Margaret - Countess of Atholl by marriage to Henry, Earl of Atholl

His daughters were witnesses to a donation made by Máel Coluim, Earl of Atholl and their mother Hextilda to the Church of St Cuthbert in Durham.

References

Young, Alan, Robert the Bruce's Rivals: The Comyns, 1213-1314, (East Linton, 1997), pp15–19.
Surtees Society 2: 84–5.

Richard
12th-century Scottish people

12th-century births
1170s deaths
Year of birth uncertain
Year of death uncertain